Östra Södermanlands Järnväg (Ö.Sl.J.), Eastern Södermanland Railway is a  narrow gauge railway in Mariefred, Sweden. Steam-hauled passenger traffic is provided all days of the week during the summer.

Operations began on a small scale at the Lina brick works in Södertälje in 1959, until a chance to take over the recently closed Läggesta-Mariefred appeared in 1964.

General remarks

Ö.Sl.J. operates traffic with  narrow gauge locomotives and carriages dating from the period 1890-1925.

The collection of rolling stock of this heritage railway is centered on the seven Swedish railways which ran scheduled passenger traffic on  narrow gauge track. The collection of passenger cars is internationally noteworthy, as  narrow gauge is typically used for industrial freight only.

Mariefred – Läggesta
This is part of the line is the heart of Ö.Sl.J. The line was originally the SJ standard gauge spur line from Läggesta to Mariefred, which the Swedish State Railways (SJ) operated until 1964 when the line was closed. Ö.Sl.J. took over the track and station in Mariefred after a few years and relaid the track to  narrow gauge.

Läggesta – Taxinge-Näsby
When the new SJ main line "Svealandsbanan" (Södertälje - Eskilstuna) was built in 1995, the old Södertälje - Eskilstuna line was closed and the track torn up on most of the line. After a 10 years long trial period running a type Y7 railcar the line has been undergoing regauging to  narrow gauge. Traffic with trains on  tracks started in May 2011.

The collection
Steam Locomotives at Östra Södermanlands Järnväg:

Nr.1 Lotta (Under restoration)

No 2 Lessebo (The only remaining original design Mallet locomotive in the world. Not operational)

Nr.2 Virå (Operational)

Nr.3 Dylta (Not operational)

Nr.4 km Nelsson (Not operational)

Nr.5 Hamra (Machinery overhaul)

Nr.6 Christina Hjelm (Under reconstruction)

Nr.7 Helgenäs (Boiler overhaul)

Nr.8 Emsfors (Operational)

Nr.9 JGJ 9 (Operational)

Nr.10 Avesta (Operational)

See also 
 List of heritage railways

External links 

 Östra Södermanlands Järnväg - Official website

Railway museums in Sweden
Heritage railways in Sweden
600 mm gauge railways in Sweden
Museums in Södermanland County